American Eagle Flight 5456, officially operating as Executive Air Charter Flight 5456, was a scheduled commuter flight between Luis Muñoz Marín International Airport in San Juan, Puerto Rico and Eugenio María de Hostos Airport in Mayagüez, Puerto Rico. The flight was operated by Executive Airlines, doing business as American Eagle, and was operated by a CASA C-212 aircraft. Instrument meteorological conditions were present as the plane made its approach to Mayagüez on June 7, 1992. The plane crashed during heavy rain into a swamp, short of the runway. The crash destroyed the aircraft, killing all five people on board.

References

External links 
 

Aviation accidents and incidents in 1992
5456
Executive Airlines accidents and incidents
Aviation accidents and incidents in the United States in 1992
1992 in Puerto Rico
Airliner accidents and incidents in Puerto Rico
Accidents and incidents involving the CASA C-212 Aviocar
Mayagüez, Puerto Rico
June 1992 events in North America